Annual may refer to:
Annual publication, periodical publications appearing regularly once per year
Yearbook
Literary annual
Annual plant
Annual report
Annual giving
Annual, Morocco, a settlement in northeastern Morocco 
Annuals (band), a musical group

See also
 Annual Review (disambiguation)
 Circannual cycle, in biology